Hueikaeana is a genus of Asian bush crickets of the tribe Mirolliini within the subfamily Phaneropterinae.

Species
The Orthoptera Species File lists the following species found in southern China, Indo-China and Malesia:
Hueikaeana albopunctata Wang & Shi, 2010
Hueikaeana alia Gorochov, 2004
Hueikaeana andreji Ingrisch, 2011
Hueikaeana directa Ingrisch, 1998 - type species
Hueikaeana dohrni (Brunner von Wattenwyl, 1891)
Hueikaeana ornata Gorochov, 2008
Hueikaeana pulchella Gorochov, 2004
Hueikaeana quadrimaculata Ingrisch, 2011

References

Tettigoniidae genera
Phaneropterinae
Orthoptera of Asia